WKEY (1340 AM) is an American radio station licensed to serve the community of Covington, Virginia. The station, which began broadcasting in 1941, is owned and operated by Todd P. Robinson, Inc. The WKEY broadcast license is held by WVJT, LLC.

The station broadcasts a country music format to the Covington/Clifton Forge area. WKEY is branded, along with its broadcast translator W278BF (103.5 FM, Covington), as "103.5 Big Country".

History

WKEY began broadcasting on May 23, 1941, as WJMA with 250 watts of power. WJMA was owned by John Arrington Jr. and his wife, Marcia. On May 26, 1942, WJMA was sold to Earl M. Key and the callsign changed to WKEY in 1943.

By 1964, the station's power had increased to 1,000 watts during the day, while the nighttime power remained at 250 watts. On June 1, 1973, WKEY was sold to WKEY, Inc., headed by E.H. Barr, for an undisclosed amount. WKEY increased its nighttime power in 1987 to 1,000 watts, matching its daytime power.

On December 20, 2002, WKEY was acquired by Quorum Radio Partners of Virginia, Inc. for $650,000. During 2002, WKEY switched from its longtime country format to oldies. On April 20, 2005, Quorum Radio Partners of Virginia, Inc. filed for bankruptcy and WKEY placed into debtor-in-possession status pending a sale. On January 1, 2006, WKEY was sold to Todd P. Robinson, Inc., for $100,000.

On May 1, 2008, the station changed its format from oldies to southern gospel, under "The Cross" branding. On January 14, 2012, WKEY began simulcasting sister station WIQO-FM, after its move to Forest, Virginia, and away from Covington. On August 9, 2012, WKEY began simulcasting full-time on translator station W278BF (103.5 FM), located in Covington, with the country format that was previously heard on WIQO.

On November 18, 2013, WKEY began streaming its signal live on the internet.

Programming

WKEY carries a mix of local and syndicated programming. Weekdays begin with a locally produced morning show called "Highway 64 with Big Al". The station also has a news department which prepares and broadcasts local news reports on weekdays. The bulk of the broadcast day's programming comes from Dial Global's Mainstream Country network. Nationally syndicated programs aired on WKEY include the "Tim White Bluegrass Show" and "zMAX Racing Country". The station carries a one-minute newscast from Fox News Radio at the top of each hour.

WKEY broadcasts live football games from Covington High School in the Fall. WKEY is an affiliate of the University of Virginia's Virginia Sports Network, which carries the school's football and basketball games. NASCAR Sprint Cup Series races can also be heard on WKEY with live coverage provided by the Motor Racing Network and the Performance Racing Network.

On Sunday mornings, WKEY airs an assortment of religious programming. The programming begins with half an hour of locally produced Gospel music program, after which the station the syndicated programs In Touch Ministries and Focus on the Family, rounding out the block with a live local church service broadcast.

Translator
In addition to the main station, WKEY is relayed by an FM translator to widen its broadcast area.

References

External links
103.5 Big Country Online

KEY
Radio stations established in 1941
1941 establishments in Virginia
Country radio stations in the United States